RadioactiveGiant is a multimedia film and television production studio and global multi-platform distributor, and multimedia publisher.  The company was founded by Albert Sandoval in 2006 and has its headquarters in Santa Monica, California.

RadioactiveGiant is a content producer and multi-platform distributor of feature films, TV, live broadcasts, made-for-web and other innovative media formats. It produces and distributes work for major studios, TV networks, independent producers, media publishers, advertisers and interactive media developers worldwide. The company develops multi-screen media channels for delivery by fiber, satellite and IP transport. RadioactiveGiant also produces interactive digital media for mobile and home entertainment platforms.

References

External links
 Official site

Film distributors of the United States